Flint Mine Hill is a mountain in Greene County, New York, in the Catskill Mountains east-northeast of Limestreet. Potic Mountain is west, Lampman Hill is east-northeast, and Hallenbeck Hill is south of Flint Mine Hill.

References

Mountains of Greene County, New York
Mountains of New York (state)